UFC Fight Night: Pettis vs. Moreno (also known as UFC Fight Night 114) was a mixed martial arts event produced by the Ultimate Fighting Championship held on August 5, 2017, at Arena Ciudad de México in Mexico City, Mexico.

Background
A flyweight bout between Sergio Pettis and Brandon Moreno headlined the event.

Chris Gruetzemacher was expected to face The Ultimate Fighter: Latin America 3 lightweight winner Martín Bravo at the event. However, Gruetzemacher pulled out of the fight on July 18 with an injury and was replaced by promotional newcomer Humberto Bandenay.

A featherweight contest between Hacran Dias and Zabit Magomedsharipov was scheduled to take place at this event, but Magomedsharipov was moved to a fight against Nick Hein at the UFC Fight Night: Struve vs. Volkov event in Rotterdam in September. In turn, Hacran Dias was removed from the card entirely.

At the weigh-ins, Alexa Grasso came in at 119 lb, three pounds over the strawweight limit of 116 lb. As a result, she was fined 20% of her purse, which went to Randa Markos and their bout proceeded at a catchweight.

This was the last event called by longtime color commentator and former fighter Brian Stann.

Results

Bonus awards
The following fighters were awarded $50,000 bonuses:
Fight of the Night: None awarded
 Performance of the Night: Niko Price, Humberto Bandenay, Dustin Ortiz, and Joseph Morales

Aftermath
On November 1, USADA announced a finding of no-fault after Moreno failed a drug test. He tested positive for trace amounts of the banned substance clenbuterol in an in-competition test in the early hours of the event. But after an investigation, USADA determined that the positive likely came from contaminated meat, an issue well known to the anti-doping agency.

With seven first-round finishes, this event ties the record for most first-round finishes in a single UFC event.

See also
List of UFC events
2017 in UFC

References

Events in Mexico City
UFC Fight Night
Mixed martial arts in Mexico
2017 in mixed martial arts
2017 in Mexican sports
August 2017 sports events in Mexico